The Copa del Generalísimo 1967 Final was the 65th final of the King's Cup. The final was played at Santiago Bernabéu in Madrid, on 2 July 1967, being won by Valencia CF, who beat Club Atlético de Bilbao 2-1.

Details

References

1967
Copa
Athletic Bilbao matches
Valencia CF matches